China Bio-Immunity, based in Dalian, China, is largest developer, producer, manufacturer of vaccine-based prophylactics and therapeutics. The Company has sales and marketing efforts in the 24 main provinces and major cities in the People's Republic of China (PRC). Its principal products, its Rabies Vaccine and Mumps Vaccine, are sold and distributed by a network of wholesale distributors, as well as through retail customers. In addition to the current distribution structure, the Company plans to further market its products through distribution agreements with local agents in several developing countries, including, but not limited to South Asia, South Africa, and countries throughout Southeast Asia.

External links
Company website

Manufacturing companies based in Dalian
Health care companies of China